Duncan E. McKinlay (October 6, 1862 – December 30, 1914) was an American lawyer and politician who served three terms as a U.S. Representative from California from 1905 to 1911.

Biography
Born in Orillia, Ontario, Canada, McKinlay attended the common schools. He later learned the trade of carriage painting and worked in Flint, Michigan, and San Francisco, Sacramento, and Santa Rosa, California. He studied law. He was admitted to the bar by the Supreme Court of California in 1892 and commenced practice in Santa Rosa. He later served as second assistant United States attorney at San Francisco 1901–1904, and first assistant United States attorney 1904–1907.

McKinlay was elected as a Republican to the Fifty-ninth, Sixtieth, and Sixty-first Congresses (March 4, 1905 – March 3, 1911). He was an unsuccessful candidate for reelection in 1910 to the Sixty-second Congress. In 1910, President William Howard Taft appointed him United States surveyor of customs for the port of San Francisco, California. He died in Berkeley, California on December 30, 1914, and was interred in Sunset Cemetery.

Positions
McKinlay was an avowed supporter of the Geary Act restricting Chinese immigration. At the Chinese Exclusion Convention in 1901, he led the speakers with the "Legal Aspects of the Chinese Question", lauded by the San Francisco Call as a "brilliant address". He concluded the speech calling for a renewal of the Geary Act which would "guard and protect [us] from the blighting curse of Asiatic immigration".

References

External links

1862 births
1914 deaths
Canadian emigrants to the United States
People from Orillia
California lawyers
Republican Party members of the United States House of Representatives from California
19th-century American politicians
19th-century American lawyers